Jatin Das Park is a station of the Kolkata Metro located on Shyama Prasad Mukherjee Road at Hazra More, Kalighat.

History

Construction

The station

Structure
Jatin Das Park is underground metro station, situated on the Kolkata Metro Line 1 of Kolkata Metro.

Station layout

Connections

Bus
Bus route number 1, 1A, 3B, 3C/1, 12C/1B, 13A, 13C, 17B, 18B/1, 18C, 21, 21/1, 37A, 40A, 40B, 41, 41B, 42A, 45B, 47/1, 47B, 80A, 80B, 204/1, 205, 208, 218/1, 228, 234/1, SD8, SD16, K7, 1A (Mini), 11A (Mini), 32 (Mini), S107/1 (Mini), S108/2 (Mini), S112 (Mini), S113 (Mini), S114 (Mini), S116 (Mini), S117 (Mini), S118 (Mini), S131 (Mini), S135 (Mini), S178 (Mini), S188 (Mini), E1, M7B, S2, S4C, S5, S5C, S6A, S7, S9A, S10A, S15G, S17A, S60, 33, AC1, AC5, AC6, AC24, AC24A, AC49A etc. serve the station.

Entry/Exit

See also

Kolkata
List of Kolkata Metro stations
Transport in Kolkata
Kolkata Metro Rail Corporation
Kolkata Suburban Railway
Kolkata Monorail
Trams in Kolkata
Tollygunge
E.M. Bypass
List of rapid transit systems
List of metro systems

References

External links
 
 Official Website for line 1
 UrbanRail.Net – descriptions of all metro systems in the world, each with a schematic map showing all stations.

Kolkata Metro stations
Railway stations in Kolkata